Nicola Cassidy (born 9 December 1955) is an Irish equestrian. She competed in the team eventing at the 2000 Summer Olympics.

References

External links
 

1955 births
Living people
Irish female equestrians
Olympic equestrians of Ireland
Equestrians at the 2000 Summer Olympics
Sportspeople from Dublin (city)